Rose Scott (8 October 1847 – 20 April 1925) was an Australian women's rights activist who advocated for women's suffrage and universal suffrage in New South Wales at the turn-of-the twentieth century. She founded the Women's Political Education League in 1902 which campaigned successfully to raise the age of consent to sixteen.

Early life
Scott was the daughter of Helenus Scott (1802–1879) and Sarah Ann Scott (née Rusden) aka Saranna, the fifth of eight children, and a granddaughter of Helenus Scott (1760–1821), a Scottish physician. Her cousins were the naturalists Harriet Morgan (née Scott) and Helena Scott. She was educated at home with her closest sister Augusta. From an early age, Rose Scott was influenced by injustices she perceived towards women in history and literature such as Joan of Arc and Katerina in The Taming of the Shrew.

Women's rights work
Scott was in essential orientation an individualist, but not a dogmatic one, and may be described as an adherent to the liberalism of John Stuart Mill. She was utilitarian in outlook, a free trader, pacifistically inclined and strongly in favour of women's rights.

In 1882, Scott began to hold a weekly salon in her Sydney home. Through these meetings, she became well known amongst politicians, judges, philanthropists, writers and poets. In 1889, she helped to found the Women's Literary Society, which grew into the Womanhood Suffrage League of New South Wales in 1891. Speaking at committee meetings gave her confidence, and she eventually became an accomplished public speaker. In April 1892 she participated in a public debate with fellow suffragist Eliza Ashton on Ashton's controversial views on marriage.

Scott's mother died in 1896, and she was left with a home and sufficient income for her needs. Her interest in votes for women led to much study of the position of women in the community, and she found that young girls were working in shops from 8 a.m. to 9 p.m. on ordinary days, and until 11 p.m. on Saturdays. Some of these girls were asked to come to her house on  Saturday and describe the conditions in which they worked, and there leading politicians such as Bernhard Wise, William Holman, W. M. Hughes and Thomas Bavin met and discussed the drafting of the bill that eventually became the early closing act of 1899.

Other reforms advocated, and eventually implemented, were the appointment of matrons at police stations and of women inspectors in factories and shops, and improvements in the conditions of women prisoners.

Scott founded and became the first President of the Women's Political Education League in 1902, a position she held until 1910. The League established branches throughout the state and consistently campaigned for the issue closest to Scott's heart: raising the age of consent from 14 to 16, achieved in 1910 with the Crimes (Girls' Protection) Act. She was also President of the Sydney Branch of the Peace Society in 1908. Other post-suffrage feminist reform campaigns she participated in included the Family Maintenance and Guardianship of Infants (1916), Women's Legal Status (1918) and First Offenders (Women) 1918 Acts.

She was also, for many years, international secretary of the National Council of Women in New South Wales. When she retired in 1921, a presentation of money was made to her which she used to found a prize for female law students, The Rose Scott Prize for Proficiency at Graduation by a Woman Candidate, at Sydney University. Another subscription was made to have her portrait painted by John Longstaff. This now hangs in the art gallery at Sydney. Scott was opposed to Federation and conscription. She was an Anglican pacifist.

Opposition to Federation 
In the late 1890s Scott was an ardent and leading opponent of the cause of Federation. The cause was, she said, 'the gravest danger which had ever threatened Australia'. 'The cry was for unity', she told large audiences, 'but it was forgotten that many crimes were committed in that name'. She traced the apparent inclination of public opinion to Federation to 'the freedom of the Australian people' having been 'too easily gained, and therefore too lightly prized'.

Death 
She died from cancer on 20 April 1925 at her home, Lynton, in Jersey Road, Woollahra.

Rose Scott Circuit, in the Canberra suburb of Chisholm, is named in her honour.

Notes

Resources
National Library of Australia. Scott, Rose (1847–1925). The National Library of Australia's Federation Gateway
State Library of New South Wales. Papers of the Scott family, 1777–1925 (ML MSS 38)

External links

 

1847 births
1925 deaths
Australian suffragists
Anglican pacifists
Australian Anglicans
British salon-holders
People from New South Wales
Burials at Rookwood Cemetery
19th-century Australian women
20th-century Australian women